Jean VIII of Harcourt (9 April 1396 – 17 August 1424, Battle of Verneuil) was a count of Aumale.  He was the son of John VII of Harcourt, count of Harcourt, and of Marie of Alençon, a "princess of the blood".

Life
He fought the English at the Battle of Agincourt and Battle of la Brossinière.  He was appointed lieutenant and captain general of Normandy, and captain of the town of castle of Rouen, in 1417.  He was killed at the Battle of Verneuil, and buried at la Saussaie in 1424.

He had one, illegitimate son (by Marguerite de Preullay, viscountess of Dreux), Louis II of Harcourt (1424–1479), bishop of Béziers (1451), archbishop of Narbonne (1451), bishop of Bayeux (1460) and Latin patriarch of Jerusalem (1460–79).

Without a legitimate heir, his office of captain of Mont Saint-Michel passed to his cousin Jean d'Orléans, comte de Dunois (companion of Joan of Arc, and husband of Marie of Harcourt), and his title of count of Aumale to his brother-in-law Antoine of Vaudémont.

References
  Gilles-André de La Roque, Histoire généalogique de la maison de Harcourt, 1662
  Dom Lenoir, Preuves généalogiques et historiques de la Maison d'Harcourt, 1907
  Georges Martin, Histoire et Généalogie de la Maison d'Harcourt, 1994
  Dictionnaire de biographie française, 1989

1396 births
1424 deaths
Counts of Aumale
House of Harcourt
People of the Hundred Years' War
15th-century military history of France